The Torneo Cuatro Naciones de Handball 2019, (2019 Four Nations Handball Tournament in spanish) held in San Juan Argentina, at the Estadio Aldo Cantoni between 23–25 October was a friendly handball tournament organised by the Argentinean Handball Confederation.

Results

Round robin
All times are local (UTC−03:00).

Final standing

References

External links
Tournament page in Argentinean Confederation website

Torneo Cuatro Naciones de Handball 2019
International handball competitions hosted by Argentina
Torneo Cuatro Naciones de Handball 2019